Calla is a genus of flowering plants in the family Araceae.

Calla may also refer to:
Calla (name)
Calla (band), a rock band from Texas via Brooklyn
Calla (album)
Calla, Ohio, a community in the United States
Calla Bryn Sturgis, fictional town in The Dark Tower V, Wolves of the Calla
Calla lily, the common name for the genus Zantedeschia of flowering plants in the family Araceae
Calla Records, a defunct independent soul music label
Common acute lymphoblastic leukemia antigen, also known as CD10 or Neprilysin
Calla (film), a 1999 South Korean film by Song Hae-sung
The Cognitive Academic Language Learning Approach (CALLA), an ESL teaching approach developed in the 1980s

See also

CALA (disambiguation)
Call (disambiguation)
Callan (disambiguation)
Callao (disambiguation)
Callas (disambiguation)
Calle (disambiguation)
Cally (disambiguation)
Carla (disambiguation)
Cella (disambiguation)
Kalla (disambiguation)